Nanhai Pearl Artificial Island is an artificial island under construction off the coast of Holiday Beach in Haikou Bay, Haikou, Hainan, China. The island is owned and being developed by HNA Group. As of April 2016, it consists of a roughly circular body of land with a bridge providing access to and from the shore. It is envisioned to ultimately become a visitor attraction with hotels and to eventually take the shape of a yin-yang symbol and be about 266 hectares.

See also

 Other artificial island in Hainan reclaimed for residential and/or tourism purpose:
 Haikou: Ruyi Island, etc.
 Sanya: Phoenix Island
 Danzhou: Ocean Flower Island

References

External links

Islands of Hainan
Artificial islands of China
Buildings and structures in Hainan
Haikou